Franklin Mine is a small unincorporated community in Houghton County, Michigan, United States. The area is on Quincy Hill, northeast of Hancock, and lying partially within Quincy Township and partially within Franklin Township.

References

External links
Several images of the mine from American Memory at the Library of Congress

Unincorporated communities in Houghton County, Michigan
Houghton micropolitan area, Michigan
Unincorporated communities in Michigan